Monashee Provincial Park is a provincial park located just outside of Cherryville, British Columbia, Canada.
It is located in the central Monashee Mountains between the Arrow Lakes and the upper Shuswap River drainage, just east of Sugar Lake. It is a remote grizzly habitat that is a walk-in only. Mount Fosthall is the highest peak in the area and can be hiked in a day. In addition to hiking and alpinism other activities include fishing.

References
BC Parks webpage

Monashee Mountains
Provincial parks of British Columbia
Arrow Lakes
1962 establishments in British Columbia
Protected areas established in 1962